Alexandria Rochell "Alex" Montgomery (born November 12, 1988) is a retired basketball player who last played for the Chicago Sky of the Women's National Basketball Association (WNBA).

Georgia  Tech statistics

Source

WNBA
Montgomery was selected the first round of the 2011 WNBA Draft (10th overall) by the New York Liberty.

On April 16, 2015 Montgomery was traded to the San Antonio Stars in exchange for the ninth-overall pick of the 2015 WNBA draft.

On February 23, 2018 Montgomery was signed by the Chicago Sky after her contract with San Antonio expired.

LBF
Alex Montgomery served from October 2012 to April 2013 by the Sport Club do Recife, the biggest club in the Northeast of Brazil. Montgomery played a key role in the team from Recife, helping lead them to a championship.

Early life
During her senior season at Lincoln High School in 2007, Alex Montgomery averaged 22.3 points, 18.8 rebounds, 8.0 assists and 6.4 blocks per game. She had seven quadruple-doubles and even a rare quintuple-double in a win over Central Kitsap, finishing with 27 points, 22 rebounds, 10 assists, 10 blocks and 10 steals.

References

External links
 

1988 births
Living people
American expatriate basketball people in Brazil
American women's basketball players
Basketball players from Tacoma, Washington
Chicago Sky players
Georgia Tech Yellow Jackets women's basketball players
New York Liberty draft picks
New York Liberty players
San Antonio Stars players
Tarbes Gespe Bigorre players
Forwards (basketball)
Guards (basketball)
21st-century American women